JFA Japan Futsal Championship (in Japanese: "JFA 全日本フットサル選手権大会") is a futsal tournament held in Japan. The organizer is the Japan Football Association (JFA).

History 
The first event was held in 1996, earlier than the F. League. From 2005 to 2015, Puma became the sponsor of the tournament, events was also known as the "Puma Cup".

Statistics

Number of wins by club

References

External links 
  

Futsal competitions in Japan
1996 establishments in Japan